Kozmik Krooz'r is a shoot 'em up video game developed by Bally Midway and released in arcades in 1982. The spaceship, a core element of the gameplay, is not an in-game graphic, but a physical plastic model.  A series of mirrors projects the mothership just above the game's monitor.

Gameplay
Players guide Kapt. Krooz'r to a rotating mothership at the top of the playfield, one which can only be entered when its tractor beam is operational. Players can also shoot enemies in one of eight directions and deflect firepower during their journey. Every fifth round there is a bonus round where Kapt. Krooz'r must pick up space junk.

Development
The game was originally known as Kapt. Krooz'r.

Legacy
The character Kapt. Krooz'r also features in the arcade game Wacko.

Kozmik Krooz'r was included in the 2004 release of Midway Arcade Treasures 2, where the mothership is represented by 3D polygons.

References

1982 video games
Arcade video games
Midway video games
Shoot 'em ups
Video games developed in the United States